Ancaster stone is Middle Jurassic oolitic limestone, quarried around Ancaster, Lincolnshire, England. There are three forms of this limestone: weatherbed, hard white and freestone. Ancaster stone is a generic term for these forms of limestone found only at Ancaster, Glebe quarry (UK Grid reference: SK992409) being the only active quarry where Ancaster Hard White and Ancaster Weatherbed are quarried.

As well as being used for the church at Ancaster and a number of village buildings, there have also been many great works of architecture constructed from Ancaster stone, including Wollaton Hall, Belton House, Harlaxton Manor, Mentmore Towers, St Pancras Station, Norwich Cathedral and St John's College, Cambridge. Ancaster stone may be seen in a modern building, in use as a facing and flooring stone, at The Collection in Lincoln, Lincolnshire. Stapleford Park is a more traditional building constructed from it.  Under certain lighting conditions the stone in its unpolished state can exhibit a greenish-blue hue.

It has been used for sculptures by Barbara Hepworth and Henry Moore.

See also

 Jerusalem stone
 Sydney sandstone

References

Further reading 

 Kent, P. British Regional Geology Eastern England 2nd edn. (1980)

External links 
 Building Research Establishment test results
  Harlaxton Manor
  Norwich cathedral
  St Johns college Cambridge
  Henry Moore - Half figure

Limestone
Building stone